SenesTech, Inc. is an agricultural biotechnology life-sciences company, specializing in fertility management as a form of pest control. The company's primary product, ContraPest is designed to make brown and black rats infertile. SenesTech is headquartered in Phoenix, Arizona.

History 
The company was founded by Dr. Loretta Mayer and several colleagues, who were researching menopause in rodents. The commercial applications of their research became apparent, and they incorporated SenesTech in 2004. In 2019, SenesTech began selling directly to the public.

Products

ContraPest 

ContraPest is a sugary liquid, designed to be attractive to, and to be consumed by rats in order to eliminate future potential offspring. However, it does not sterilize the rats, so a continuous supply is required. The company claims that in field tests, ContraPest use caused a reduction in rat populations of roughly 40% over a period of 12 weeks or longer. 

The product was approved for commercial use by the U.S. Environmental Protection Agency in August 2016. Removal of the "Restricted Use Only" label from ContraPest was permitted by the EPA in October 2018. The active ingredients of ContraPest are 4-vinylcyclohexene diepoxide (VCD), which reduces oocytes in immature ovarian follicles and triptolide reducing reproductive effects on both males and females.

See also 
 4-vinylcyclohexene diepoxide
 Pest control

References 

Biotechnology companies of the United States
Companies based in Arizona
Companies listed on the Nasdaq